Pence is an unincorporated census-designated place located in the town of Pence, Iron County, Wisconsin, United States. As of the 2010 census, its population is 131.

References

Census-designated places in Iron County, Wisconsin
Census-designated places in Wisconsin